Eastdale is an extinct town in Costilla County, in the U.S. state of Colorado. The GNIS classifies it as a populated place.

History
Eastdale was laid out in 1890. A post office called Eastdale was established in 1895, and remained in operation until 1909.  A large share of the first settlers were Mormons.

References

Geography of Costilla County, Colorado
Ghost towns in Colorado